Sean Sweeney (born 17 August 1969) is a former professional footballer, who played for Clydebank, Airdrieonians, Livingston, Hamilton Academical and Albion Rovers in the Scottish Football League. Sweeney had two spells with Airdrieonians, returning to the club in 2001 when it was in financial trouble.

References

External links

1969 births
Living people
Scottish footballers
Clydebank F.C. (1965) players
Airdrieonians F.C. (1878) players
Livingston F.C. players
Hamilton Academical F.C. players
Albion Rovers F.C. players
Scottish Football League players
Association football central defenders
Scotland under-21 international footballers
Footballers from Glasgow